Jon Challinor (born 2 December 1980) is an English semi-professional footballer who plays as a defender or midfielder for  club Stamford. He has played in the Football League for York City.

Challinor started his career with Rushden & Diamonds, and after being released in 2000 had spells with Stamford, Cambridge City, the Kalamazoo Kingdom and St Albans City. He reached the 2004 Football Conference play-off Final with Aldershot Town, and after another unsuccessful play-off campaign in the 2004–05 season signed for Exeter City in 2005. He played in the 2007 Conference National play-off Final defeat before returning to Rushden in 2007. He left for Cambridge United a year later, playing for them in the 2009 Conference Premier play-off Final. After spells with Forest Green Rovers, Mansfield Town, Brackley Town, Newport County and Kettering Town, Challinor signed for York City in 2011. Here, he won promotion to League Two in his fourth appearance in a Conference Premier play-off final, following victory in the 2012 Final, also winning in the 2012 FA Trophy Final. He was released by the club a year later.

Early and personal life
Challinor was born in Northampton, Northamptonshire. He married his wife Lara in 2007. As Challinor is a fan of the Star Wars films, The Imperial March was played as part of the ceremony.

Club career

Early career
Challinor began his career in the youth system at Rushden & Diamonds. He made his first-team debut for the Football Conference club as an 18-year-old in a Conference League Cup match against Farnborough Town on 22 December 1998. He signed a contract at the end of his scholarship, but after failing to break into the first team squad was released in May 2000. Challinor dropped two divisions to join Southern League Division One East club Stamford in search of first team football. He impressed with Stamford, moving to Southern League Premier Division club Cambridge City in February 2001, scoring two goals in 11 league appearances before the end of the 2000–01 season. He made 46 appearances, scoring three goals, in 2001–02 before spending the close season with the Kalamazoo Kingdom in the American USL Premier Development League.

Challinor returned to England after joining Isthmian League Premier Division club St Albans City on a two-year contract in August 2002. His debut came in St Albans' 4–0 victory away to Ware in the Herts Charity Cup first round on 3 August 2002, before scoring his first goal in a 2–0 home win against Heybridge Swifts on 26 August. Challinor played in St Albans' 4–1 FA Cup first round defeat to Second Division team Stockport County on 16 November 2002. He scored six goals in 57 appearances in 2002–03, before spending a second close season with the Kalamazoo Kingdom, making 17 appearances and scoring two goals in the USL Premier Development League.

Aldershot Town
After being released by St Albans, Challinor signed for Football Conference club Aldershot Town on 8 August 2003, having appeared for them in pre-season. He made his debut in a 2–1 home win over Accrington Stanley on 10 August 2003, before scoring his first goal in a 5–2 win away to Telford United on 16 August. Having made an impressive start for Aldershot, scoring five goals in 12 appearances, Challinor signed a contract lasting until the end of 2004–05 on 14 October 2003. After being sent off in a 2–0 home defeat to Margate on 20 December 2003 he was given a three-match suspension, making his return in a 4–0 defeat away to Farnborough on 24 January 2004. He played in the 2004 Football Conference play-off Final against Shrewsbury Town at the Britannia Stadium, which Aldershot lost 3–0 in a penalty shoot-out after a 1–1 draw following extra time. His 2003–04 season with Aldershot finished having scored 13 goals in 48 appearances.

Aldershot qualified for the play-offs again in 2004–05, and Challinor played in both semi-final matches against Carlisle United, which ended in a 2–2 draw on aggregate. Challinor missed his penalty kick in the penalty shoot-out, before Danny Livesey scored the penalty that secured Carlisle's place in the play-off final. Having finished the season with nine goals in 44 appearances, Challinor was released by Aldershot on 18 May 2005, despite being rated as one of the best attacking midfielders in the Conference National.

Exeter City
On 20 May 2005, Challinor joined Conference National club Exeter City on a two-year contract. Manager Alex Inglethorpe described him by saying "He's 24 years of age and he fits the bill of the type of player that will help us next season. I liken him to Tim Cahill of Everton. He likes to get forward and score goals, and has a good grounding in both League and non-League football." Challinor made his debut in a 2–0 win away to Gravesend & Northfleet on 13 August 2005, before scoring his first goal on 3 September in a 2–2 away to Dagenham & Redbridge. He scored in a 4–0 win over former club Aldershot on 26 December 2005, during which he was targeted by opposition fans, after his former manager Terry Brown claimed he left Aldershot for financial reasons. After the match, Challinor said "I got one over on the manager and proved him wrong, he didn't think I was good enough. Their fans were at me throughout the game but it only made me focus more." He finished 2005–06 with 13 goals in 48 appearances for Exeter.

Challinor was targeted by fellow Conference National club Grays Athletic in December 2006, but after remaining at Exeter he was offered a new contract at the club in February 2007, which he did not sign. He played for Exeter in the 2007 Conference National play-off Final on 20 May 2007, the first Conference play-off final to be played at the newly rebuilt Wembley Stadium. He assisted Lee Phillips' ninth-minute opening goal for Exeter, although the team went on to lose 2–1 to Morecambe. Challinor made 48 appearances and scored 10 goals for Exeter in 2006–07.

Return to Rushden & Diamonds
Challinor returned to Conference Premier club Rushden & Diamonds after signing a two-year contract on 28 May 2007. He made his debut in a 1–1 draw away to Woking on 11 August 2007, before scoring his first goal in a 1–1 draw away to Salisbury City on 8 September. He started the season playing in midfield, but when being played as a striker in late February 2008 he went on a run of scoring six goals in five consecutive matches.

He appeared for Rushden in the 2008 Conference League Cup Final against Aldershot at the Recreation Ground on 3 April 2008. The match finished a 3–3 draw after extra time, but Aldershot won 4–3 in a penalty shoot-out. Challinor made 57 appearances and scored 10 goals for Rushden in 2007–08, only missing out on ever-present status after missing the last match of the season against Grays Athletic through injury.

Cambridge United and Mansfield Town

He joined Conference Premier rivals Cambridge United on a two-year contract for a £15,000 fee on 6 August 2008. His debut came in a 1–0 win away to Northwich Victoria on 9 August 2008, and scored his first goal with a stoppage time winner in a 1–0 home win over Lewes on 7 October 2008. Soon after he was told by manager Gary Brabin to provide more support for the team's strikers, with Challinor agreeing, saying "It will put the added responsibility on me to start shooting and take some pressure off the forwards. If the midfield can get some goals as well, then that will help the team". He immediately followed this up with the winning goal against Weymouth in a 1–0 home win on 11 October 2008, coming from a low right-footed shot into the corner from 25 yards.

Challinor's first sending off for Cambridge came after receiving a second yellow card during a 5–0 home defeat to Crawley Town in the FA Trophy second round on 14 January 2009. He made his return from suspension in a 1–1 home draw with Oxford United on 29 January 2009. Challinor came on as a 79th-minute substitute for Paul Carden in the 2009 Conference Premier play-off Final at Wembley Stadium, in which Torquay United won 2–0. Having struggled to make an impact for Cambridge in 2008–09, which he finished with two goals in 39 appearances, he was transfer listed.

He was sent out on loan for the start of 2009–10 to Cambridge's divisional rivals Forest Green Rovers for one month on 7 August 2009. Challinor made his debut the following day in a 2–1 home defeat against Kettering Town, going on to make seven appearances at Forest Green. Forest Green had been interested in taking Challinor on another loan, until appointing a new manager. He left Cambridge on loan again after joining Conference Premier rivals Mansfield Town on a two-month loan on 20 November 2009. Challinor made a scoring debut for Mansfield with the equalising goal from close range in a 1–1 draw at home to Eastbourne Borough on 21 November 2009. After making six appearances and scoring one goal in his loan spell, Challinor signed permanently for Mansfield for the rest of the season on 6 January 2010. He was released by Mansfield at the end of 2009–10, having made 15 appearances and scored two goals after signing permanently.

Brackley Town and Newport County
Challinor signed with Southern League Premier Division club Brackley Town in July 2010, after he had been set to sign for Corby Town of the Conference North, with whom he had been on trial. He then signed for Conference Premier club Newport County on a short-term contract on 30 October 2010, making his debut later that day as a 28th-minute substitute for Martin John in a 2–1 home defeat to Kettering Town, but was himself substituted in the 73rd minute for Robbie Matthews. Challinor scored on his next appearance for Newport, with the winning goal after netting Sam Deering's cross in the 29th minute of extra time in a 1–0 victory away to Wealdstone in an FA Trophy first round replay on 13 December 2010. He was released by Newport on 30 December 2010, having made four appearances and scored one goal for the club.

Kettering Town
He joined Conference Premier club Kettering Town on a contract until the end of 2010–11 on 18 January 2011. Kettering were fighting against relegation, and Challinor was quoted as saying "We have to stay positive. We know it's a transitional period for the club and there is a lot going on". He made his debut later that day as a half-time substitute for Callum Wilson in Kettering's 2–1 loss away to Grimsby Town. His first goal for Kettering came in stoppage time against Southport in a 3–1 home victory on 30 April 2011, having entered the match in the 89th minute. Challinor finished the season with 14 appearances and one goal for Kettering. He agreed to stay at Kettering ahead of 2011–12 on non-contract terms, in the belief that a permanent contract would later be agreed, and started the season playing as a defensive midfielder.

York City

On 25 August 2011, Challinor signed for Kettering's Conference Premier rivals York City on a contract until January 2012, having impressed manager Gary Mills when playing against York for Kettering two days earlier. He made his debut a day later, coming on as a 56th-minute substitute for Paddy McLaughlin in a 0–0 draw away to Fleetwood Town. Challinor was soon converted into a right back at York, a position in which he displayed composure and an ability to start attacking moves. His first goal for York came in a 4–2 win away to Hayes & Yeading United on 22 October 2011 with a drilled shot into the bottom right corner of the goal from the edge of the penalty area.

He signed a new contract with York until the end of the season in January 2012. He featured in the York team that won 2–0 in the 2012 FA Trophy Final at Wembley Stadium against his former club Newport on 12 May 2012. Eight days later he again played at Wembley Stadium to win promotion to League Two through the 2012 Conference Premier play-off Final with a 2–1 victory over Luton Town. Thus, Challinor was successful in achieving promotion to the Football League in his fourth appearance in a Conference Premier play-off final. Having made 51 appearances and scored three goals for York in 2011–12, he signed a new one-year contract with the club in July 2012.

Ahead of Challinor's first season as a Football League player, he was quoted as saying "It's been a long time coming so I'm going to embrace it and enjoy every minute. I think almost every team I have played for has gone on to reach the League so to finally achieve it is a dream come true but it doesn't end there". He made his first appearance as a League player in a League Cup first round match away to Doncaster Rovers on 11 August 2012 as an 87th-minute substitute for McLaughlin. York lost 4–2 in a penalty shoot-out after a 1–1 extra time draw, although Challinor was successful in converting his penalty. He finished 2012–13 with 22 appearances before being released by York on 30 April 2013.

Return to Stamford and FC Halifax Town
Challinor re-signed for Stamford in August 2013, after playing for the Northern Premier League Premier Division club during pre-season. After impressive performances throughout December 2013, which culminated in him being named Stamford's Player of the Month, Challinor signed a dual registration deal with Conference Premier team FC Halifax Town on 7 January 2014. He made his debut in a 0–0 draw away to Wrexham on 11 January 2014. Challinor made five appearances for Halifax before resuming playing for Stamford in February 2014. He played in the final of the Lincolnshire Senior Cup as Stamford beat Brigg Town 5–4 in a penalty shoot-out following a 3–3 draw after extra time on 29 April 2014. Challinor took over as caretaker manager of Stamford on 5 November 2015, following the sacking of Andrew Wilson. He remained in charge until the appointment of Graham Drury as manager on 12 November 2015. He had made 30 appearances and scored 2 goals in all competitions by the time the 2019–20 season was abandoned and results expunged because of the COVID-19 pandemic in England.

International career
Challinor was capped twice by the England National Game XI, the team that represents England at non-League level, making his debut against Belgium on 4 November 2003 before making his second appearance against Italy on 11 February 2004.

Career statistics

Managerial statistics

Honours
York City
Conference Premier play-offs: 2012
FA Trophy: 2011–12

Stamford
Lincolnshire Senior Cup: 2013–14, 2014–15

References

External links

Profile at the Stamford A.F.C. website

1980 births
Living people
Footballers from Northampton
English footballers
England semi-pro international footballers
Association football defenders
Association football midfielders
Rushden & Diamonds F.C. players
Stamford A.F.C. players
Cambridge City F.C. players
Kalamazoo Kingdom players
St Albans City F.C. players
Aldershot Town F.C. players
Exeter City F.C. players
Cambridge United F.C. players
Forest Green Rovers F.C. players
Mansfield Town F.C. players
Brackley Town F.C. players
Newport County A.F.C. players
Kettering Town F.C. players
York City F.C. players
FC Halifax Town players
Southern Football League players
Isthmian League players
USL League Two players
National League (English football) players
English Football League players
Northern Premier League players
English football managers
Stamford A.F.C. managers
Northern Premier League managers
English expatriate footballers
Expatriate soccer players in the United States
English expatriate sportspeople in the United States